A diadem is a type of crown, specifically an ornamental headband worn by monarchs and others as a badge of royalty.

Overview
The word derives from the Greek διάδημα diádēma, "band" or "fillet", from διαδέω diadéō, "I bind round", or "I fasten". The term originally referred to the embroidered white silk ribbon, ending in a knot and two fringed strips often draped over the shoulders, that surrounded the head of the king to denote his authority. Such ribbons were also used to crown victorious athletes in important sports games in antiquity. It was later applied to a metal crown, generally in a circular or "fillet" shape. For example, the crown worn by Queen Juliana of the Netherlands was a diadem, as was that of a baron later (in some countries surmounted by three globes). The ancient Celts were believed to have used a thin, semioval gold plate called a mind (Old Irish) as a diadem. Some of the earliest examples of these types of crowns can be found in ancient Egypt, from the simple fabric type to the more elaborate metallic type, and in the Aegean world.

A diadem is also a jewelled ornament in the shape of a half crown, worn by women and placed over the forehead (in this sense, also called tiara). In some societies, it may be a wreath worn around the head. The ancient Persians wore a high and erect royal tiara encircled with a diadem. Hera, queen of the Greek gods, wore a golden crown called the diadem.

The "Priest King" statue made by the Indus Valley civilization (c. 3300 – c. 1300 BCE) wore a headband that is possibly a diadem.

By extension, "diadem" can be used generally for an emblem of regal power or dignity. The y Roman emperor's head regalia worn, from the time of Diocletian onwards, is described as a diadem in the original sources. It was this object that the Foederatus general Odoacer returned to Emperor Zeno (the emperor of the Eastern Roman Empire) after his expulsion of the usurper Romulus Augustus from Rome in 476 AD.

Gallery

See also
 Civic crown
 Mural crown

References

External links

 Diadem at Livius.org
 Diadem at Everything2.com

Crowns (headgear)
Types of jewellery